Trigonopterus dimorphus is a species of flightless weevil in the genus Trigonopterus from Indonesia.

Etymology
The specific name is derived from di-, a prefix meaning "two", and the Greek word morphe, meaning gestalt.

Description
Individuals measure 2.94–3.80 mm in length.  The body is elongated.  General coloration is black, except for the antennae, tarsi, and tibiae, which are rust-colored.

Range

Phylogeny
T. dimorphus is part of the T. dimorphus species group.

References

dimorphus
Beetles described in 2014
Beetles of Asia
Insects of Indonesia